The Great Brak River is a river in the Western Cape, South Africa. The mouth of the river lies at the town of Great Brak River which falls under the Mossel Bay Municipality. The nearest towns are Mossel Bay, 24 km to the west, and the largest town in the southern Cape George, 34 km to the east by road.

The main tributaries of the Great Brak are the Perdeberg River, Tweeriviere River and Varings River.
The Wolwedans Dam is the only dam in the river.

History
In 1734 Jan de la Fontaine, Governor of the Cape Province, claimed Mossel Bay for the Dutch East India Company and the Great Brak River was proclaimed the eastern boundary of the Cape.
This river should not be confused with the Brak River in Limpopo Province.

See also 
 List of rivers of South Africa
 List of reservoirs and dams in South Africa

References

Rivers of the Western Cape
Internal borders of South Africa